Tygh Runyan (born June 13, 1976) is an actor and musician.

Career
Runyan has had a long career of character and supporting roles.  His most notable roles are as Dr. Robert Caine in Stargate Universe and Fabien Marchal in Versailles. His film work includes Disturbing Behavior, Blonde, Road to Nowhere, and The Immaculate Conception of Little Dizzle.

Runyan's character in Versailles is described as "the brooding, mysterious and feared chief of police", but became a favourite with "superfans" of the series. The actor commented, "One woman tried to hand me her baby ... I was like, ‘You know who Fabien is, right? He tortures people. Are you sure you want to do that?’"

Music
As a musician, Runyan has been a member of Beans and The Awkward Stage and scored the films Various Positions and Control Alt Delete. He currently plays in the band Corredor from Los Angeles.

Selected filmography
 1993 Judgment Day: The John List Story
 1995 Once in a Blue Moon
 1997 Kitchen Party
 1998 Disturbing Behavior
 1999 Our Guys: Outrage in Glen Ridge
 1999 Touched
 2001 Antitrust
 2001 15 Minutes
 2002 K-19: The Widowmaker
 2002 Various positions
 2004 Family Sins
 2006 Final Days of Planet Earth
 2006 Snakes on a Plane
 2006 Mount Pleasant
 2006 Holiday Wishes
 2006-2007 Battlestar Galactica TV series
 2007 Boot Camp
 2008 Confessions of a Go-Go Girl
 2009-2010 SGU Stargate Universe TV series
 2010 Road to Nowhere
 2010 Thirst
 2011 Doppelgänger Paul
 2012 Insoupçonnable (The Hunt for the I-5 Killer)
 2012 It's Christmas, Carol!
 2014 Forgive or Forget
 2015-2018 Versailles
 2016 Harvest 2019 Thicker than Water 2022 Blonde''

Awards and nominations

References

External links

1976 births
Living people
Male actors from Denver
Canadian male film actors
Canadian male television actors
Canadian indie rock musicians
Musicians from Denver